HUST USVs are unmanned surface vehicles developed by Huazhong University of Science and Technology (HUST), and by end of 2021, two USVs have been revealed to be in service:

HUSTER-12S
HUSTER-12S is a small USV designed for surveying and patrol missions.Standard onboard equipment includes differential GPS, inertial navigation system, various cameras.HUSTER-12S can operate in either remote control or fully autonomous modes, and has been successfully deployed to demonstrate its swarm capability.Specification:
Length (m): 1.5
Displacement (t): 0.025
Propulsion: electric
Speed (kt): 20

HUSTER-68
HUSTER-68 is the larger cousin of HUSTER-12S, and it is 6.8 meters long,

and like its smaller cousin HUSTER-68, it can operate in either remote control or fully autonomous modes.With standard onboard equipment including laser radar, laser rangefinder, fibre-optic gyroscope, HUSTER-68 is designed for survey, patrol, surveillance and law enforcement missions.
HUSTER-68 is one of the few USV that is capable of launching and recovering UAVs.Specification:
Length (m): 6.8
Propulsion: Diesel with pump-jet
Speed (kt): 30
Endurance (nm): 120

References

Auxiliary ships of the People's Liberation Army Navy
Unmanned surface vehicles of China